The IPSC South African Rifle Championship is an IPSC level 3 championship held once a year by the South African Practical Shooting Association.

Champions 
The following is a list of current and previous champions.

Overall category

Lady category

Senior category

Super Senior category

References 

Match Results - 2012 IPSC South African Rifle Championship
Match Results - 2013 IPSC South African Rifle Championship
Match Results - 2015 IPSC South African Rifle Championship
Match Results - 2016 IPSC South African Rifle Championship

IPSC shooting competitions
National shooting championships
South Africa sport-related lists
Shooting competitions in South Africa